Łęgowo may refer to the following places:
Łęgowo, Greater Poland Voivodeship (west-central Poland)
Łęgowo, Strzelce-Drezdenko County in Lubusz Voivodeship (west Poland)
Łęgowo, Zielona Góra County in Lubusz Voivodeship (west Poland)
Łęgowo, Pomeranian Voivodeship (north Poland)
Łęgowo, Iława County in Warmian-Masurian Voivodeship (north Poland)
Łęgowo, Olecko County in Warmian-Masurian Voivodeship (north Poland)